is a private university in Sakai, Osaka, Japan. The school was founded in 1964 as a women's junior college. After becoming coeducational in 2000, it became a four-year college in 2002.

Academic Faculties
This university has following faculties.

Faculty of Social Sciences 

 Department of Social Sciences
 Economic and Business Administration Course
 Global Studies Course
 Tourism Course
 Sports and Management Course
 Department of Media Studies
 Broadcasting and Media Course
 Visual Arts Course
 Information Studies Course

Faculty of Human Life Studies 

 Department of Human Life Studies
 Confectionery Studies Course
 Interior Architectural Design Course
 Fashion Design and Merchandise Course
 Department of Food and Nutrition
 Department of Food and Nutrition

References

External links
Official website 

Educational institutions established in 1964
Private universities and colleges in Japan
Universities and colleges in Osaka Prefecture
1964 establishments in Japan
Sakai, Osaka